The village of Althagen on the peninsula of Fischland-Darß-Zingst in the German state of Mecklenburg-Vorpommern has been a part of the municipality of Ahrenshoop since 1950. Until 1945, the border between Mecklenburg and Pomerania ran between Althagen and Ahrenshoop along the border road, Grenzweg.

The Bakelberg knoll lies close to the steep coast of Althagen/Niehagen. At 17.9 metres above sea level, it is the highest point on Fischland. Althagen has a port on the bodden coast.

Well known residents of Althagen include the designer, Gertrud Kleinhempel (1875-1948), the writer, Käthe Miethe (1893-1961) and (from 1944) the well-known artist couple Fritz Koch-Gotha (1877-1956) and Dora Koch-Stetter (1881-1968). Koch-Stetter's 1911 expressionist painting, The red house in Althagen, is one of her most famous works to this day.

From 1955, Fischland Pottery (Fischlandkeramik), was developed in their ceramics workshoops by the next generation of the artist family of Koch [-Gotha and -Stetter], artist and potter, Barbara Klünder (1919-1988), and her husband, the artist Arnold Klünder (1909-1976) together with artist, Frida Löber (1910-1989) and the sculptor and potter, Wilhelm Löber (1903-1981).

References 

Vorpommern-Rügen
Villages in Mecklenburg-Western Pomerania